Mad Mad House is a 2004 reality television series about a group of ten contestants competing for $100,000. The contestants live together in a house inhabited by another group of people known as the alts (for their alternative lifestyles). The alts voted the contestants off by judging them on their ability to perform "trials" which were based loosely on the practices of each alt's lifestyle, and their behavior and attitude with the other guests. The show aired on the Sci Fi Channel in the United States and on Space in Canada. Reruns have also been aired on Fox Reality Channel.

Alts
 Fiona Horne (The Witch)
 David "Avocado" Wolfe (The Naturist)
 Art Aguirre (The Modern Primitive)
 Don Henrie (The Vampire)
 "Iya" Ta'Shia Asanti (The Voodoo Priestess)

Guests

Episode list

Eliminations table

Color key

 – Trial Winner

Notes
: The Alts did not vote this episode, instead choosing to make the remaining guests vote for each other.

Critical response
David Bianculli of the Daily News called Mad Mad House a "bad bad show" (a bon mot that other reviewers would also make). Comparing the series to previous ones produced by Smith and Weed, including Paradise Hotel and Forever Eden, Bianculli pronounced Mad Mad House to be "their worst work yet". He mocked the contestants and berated the alts as "losers". Virginia Heffernan of The New York Times found the series "unsettling" and "ghoulish" but wondered if it might lead middle America to examine the casualness of their religious beliefs. The premiere episode drew a rating of 1.57 million viewers.

In February 2004, the National African Religion Congress sued the producers of Mad Mad House saying that it falsely represented Ta'Shia Asanti as a voodoo priestess. The group claimed that her dress identified her as a priestess of Yemoja of the Ifá tradition of the Yoruba people. The suit sought a court order requiring that the program not identify Asanti as a voodoo priestess. The group dropped the suit two months later after the network agreed to add a disclaimer to its website.

See also
 Vampire film
List of vampire television series

Notes

References
 Cassingham, Randy (2006). The True Stella Awards. Penguin. .

External links
Official Website (via Internet Archive)
 

2000s American reality television series
2004 American television series debuts
2004 American television series endings
Syfy original programming